Avish Rasiklal Patel (born 31 July 1994) is an English former first-class cricketer.

Patel was born in July 1994 at Leicester, where he was educated Leicester Grammar School before going up to Robinson College, Cambridge. While studying at Cambridge, he made two first-class appearances for Cambridge University against Oxford University in The University Matches of 2015 and 2016, in addition to making a single first-class appearance for Cambridge MCCU against Essex in 2016. He scored 118 runs in his three first-class matches, with a top score of 61 for Cambridge University. With his leg break bowling, he took 13 wickets at an average of 33.53, with Patel taking two five wicket hauls and best figures of 5 for 86.

Notes and references

External links

1994 births
Living people
People from Leicester
People educated at Leicester Grammar School
Alumni of Robinson College, Cambridge
English cricketers
Cambridge University cricketers
Cambridge MCCU cricketers
British sportspeople of Indian descent
British Asian cricketers